Paratelmatobius cardosoi is a species of frog in the family Leptodactylidae. It is endemic to Brazil where it is known in the Serra do Mar range, São Paulo state, southeastern Brazil. The specific name cardosoi honors Adão José Cardoso, a Brazilian herpetologist.
Its natural habitats are primary and secondary forest, forest clearings and forest edges. It is threatened by habitat loss.

References

cardosoi
Endemic fauna of Brazil
Amphibians of Brazil
Amphibians described in 1999
Taxonomy articles created by Polbot